Khaliajuri is an upazila (sub-district) of the Netrokona District in Bangladesh, part of the Mymensingh Division.

History
Until the middle of the fourteenth century AD, the Bhati Rajya (Khaliajuri and surrounding areas) was the capital of Kamarupa. In the fourteenth century, a Kshatriya monk named Jitari invaded and occupied Bhati Rajya. Another Kshatriya monk named Lambodar came took over the rule of Bhati in the twelfth century. Nagendranath Basu asserts that Lambodar and Jitari may have been the same person.

In the 16th-century, Khaliajuri was home to a Bengali Hindu man called Shitanath Om. His three sons; Raghunath Om, Kamakhya Om and Maheshnath Om, later found employment under Khwaja Usman of Bokainagar, a Baro-Bhuiyan chief who had control over large parts of Greater Mymensingh. Following the defeat of Raja Subid Narayan of Ita by Khwaja Usman and his allies which included the Om family, the Om brothers migrated to Satgaon in Sreemangal, Sylhet where they were given jagir.

In 1906, a thana (police outpost) was established in Khaliajuri. Khaliajuri Thana's status was upgraded to upazila (sub-district) in 1983 as part of the President of Bangladesh Hussain Muhammad Ershad's decentralisation programme.

Geography
It has 12903 households and total area . It is bounded by Mohanganj and Jamalganj upazilas on the north, Itna upazila on the south, Sulla and Derai upazilas on the east, Madan upazila on the west.

Demographics
According to 2011 Bangladesh census, Khaliajuri had a population of 97,450. Males constituted 51.10% of the population and females 48.90%. Muslims formed 66.43% of the population, Hindus 33.54%, Christians 0.02%, and others 0.02%. Khaliajuri had a literacy rate of 30.39% for the population 7 years and above.

As of the 1991 Bangladesh census, Khaliajuri had a population of 75,801. Males constituted 52.31% of the population, and females 47.69%. This Upazila's eighteen up population is 39,052. Khaliajuri had an average literacy rate, of 21.5% (7+ years), and the national average of 32.4% literate.

Administration
Khaliajuri Thana was formed in 1906 and it was turned into an upazila in 1983.

Khaliajuri Upazila is divided into six union parishads: Chakua, Gazipur, Khaliajuri, Krishnapur, Mendipur, and Nagar. The union parishads are subdivided into 54 mauzas and 75 villages.

Notable people
Mustafa Jabbar, inventor of the Bijoy Bengali keyboard which was formerly the most widely used Bengali input method
Mohammad Hadis Uddin, 23rd Inspector General of Bangladesh Police
Om family, historic family

See also
Upazilas of Bangladesh
Districts of Bangladesh
Divisions of Bangladesh

Gallery

References

1906 establishments in British India
Khaliajuri Upazila